Communications Earth & Environment is a peer-reviewed, open access, scientific journal in environmental science and planetary science published by Nature Portfolio since 2020. The editor-in-chief is Heike Langenberg. Communications Earth & Environment was created as a sub-journal to Nature Communications following the introduction of Communications Biology, Communications Chemistry, and Communications Physics in 2018.

Abstracting and indexing 
The journal is abstracted and indexed in:

 Astrophysics Data System (ADS) 
 Science Citation Index Expanded
 Scopus

According to the Journal Citation Reports, the journal has a 2021 impact factor of 7.290, ranking it 48th out of 279 journals in the category "Environmental Sciences" and 9th out of 201 journals in the category "Geosciences, Multidisciplinary".

See also
Nature
Nature Communications
Scientific Reports

References

External links

Nature Research academic journals
Earth and atmospheric sciences journals
Environmental science journals
Open access journals
Publications established in 2020
English-language journals
Creative Commons-licensed journals
Continuous journals